Sergey Ilyushchenko (born 31 January 1980) is a Kazakhstani speed skater. He competed in the men's 5000 metres event at the 2002 Winter Olympics.

References

1980 births
Living people
Kazakhstani male speed skaters
Olympic speed skaters of Kazakhstan
Speed skaters at the 2002 Winter Olympics
Sportspeople from Almaty
Speed skaters at the 1999 Asian Winter Games
Speed skaters at the 2003 Asian Winter Games
21st-century Kazakhstani people